The Patriot League men's soccer tournament is the conference championship tournament in college soccer for the Patriot League.  The tournament has been held every year since 1990. It is a single-elimination tournament with seeding based on conference records and the regular-season champion hosting the semifinal and final matches. The field expanded from four to six teams when the league increased membership from eight to ten universities in 2013. The winner, declared conference champion, receives the conference's automatic bid to the NCAA Division I men's soccer championship.

Champions

Key

Finals

Source: Patriot League 2019 Men's Soccer Record Book.

Performance by school

Most championships 

Italics indicate a school that is no longer a conference member

References

External links